Sir William de Lindsay (died c.1200), Lord of Ercildum, Crawford, Baron of Luffness, Justiciar of Lothian was a 12th-century Scottish noble.

Life
Lindsay was a son of Walter de Lindsay. William inherited half moiety of the barony of Cavendish, Suffolk, through his wife Aleanora, as heiress to her nephew Hugh de Limesay. During 1164 he sat in the Scottish Parliament as Baron of Luffness. After King William I of Scotland was captured in 1174 at the Battle of Alnwick, William was provided as a hostage for William I at Falaise, Normandy. He held the office of Justiciar of Lothian between 1189 and 1199.

Marriage and issue
He married Alienora de Limesi (Aleanora de Limesay), daughter of Gerard, Lord of Limesay and Amicia de Bidun, they had the following known issue:
David de Lindsay of Crawford and Ercildum (died 1214), married Marjorie de Huntingdon, had issue.
Walter de Lindsay of Molesworth and Lamberton (died 1221), had issue.  Note some sources such as Stringer (1985) Earl David of Huntingdon, p. 309, and McAndrew (2006) Scotland's Historic Heraldry, p. 93, make Walter of Lamberton as a brother, rather than a son, of William 1st Lord of Crawford.
William de Lindsay of Luffness (died 1236), married Avice de Lancaster, had issue.

Citations

References
 

12th-century Scottish people
Medieval Scottish knights
William